The 1892-93 season was Sunderland's 13th season in existence, and their third season as a Football League club.

Having won their first league title in the previous season, Sunderland went on to dominate the Football League in 1892-93, winning their second title by 11 points. They became the second team after Preston North End to win back-to-back titles. Sunderland remained unbeaten at home all season for the second season in a row. They became the first team to score 100 league goals in a single season (in 30 games) and only failed to score in a single league game (vs. Wolves). Forward John Campbell topped the league goalscoring charts (29 goals) for a second consecutive season.

The season saw the First Division expanded to 16 teams and a Second Division added, with Promotion and relegation introduced to the league for the first time. The expanded league saw Sunderland face The Wednesday, Nottingham Forest and Newton Heath for the first time. Across the two games against Newton Heath (which would go on to become Manchester United) Sunderland scored 11 goals without reply.

First team squad

Players Out

Competitions

Football League

League table

Matches

FA Cup

Matches

Squad Statistics

|}

References

 All the Lads: A Complete Who's Who of Sunderland A.F.C., Dykes, Gareth & Lamming, Douglas, Polar Print Group Ltd, 1999
 Sunderland AFC: The Official History 1879-2000, Days, Paul, Business Education Publishers Ltd, 1999
 The StatCat, www.thestatcat.co.uk, last accessed: 2018-11-02

1892-93
Sunderland
English football championship-winning seasons